The 1988 Girabola was the tenth season of top-tier football competition in Angola. Atlético Petróleos de Luanda were the defending champions.

The league comprised 14 teams, the bottom three of which were relegated.

Petro de Luanda were crowned champions, winning their 5th title, and third in a row, while Desportivo de Benguela, Dínamos do Kwanza Sul, Fabril do Uíge and Inter do Namibe were relegated.

Manuel of Primeiro de Agosto finished as the top scorer with 16 goals.

Changes from the 1987 season
Relegated: Desportivo da Chela, Progresso do Sambizanga, União do Bié
Promoted: Desportivo de Benguela, Fabril do Uíge and Inter do Namibe

League table

Results

Season statistics

Top scorer
 Manuel Domingos Martins

Champions

References

External links
Federação Angolana de Futebol

Angola
Angola
Girabola seasons